Sharyn Renshaw is an Australian international Lawn Bowls player.

In 2010, she won the silver medal in the triples at the 2010 Commonwealth Games in the Women's triples event.

References 

Living people
Bowls players at the 2010 Commonwealth Games
Australian female bowls players
Commonwealth Games medallists in lawn bowls
1961 births
Commonwealth Games silver medallists for Australia
21st-century Australian women
Medallists at the 2010 Commonwealth Games